The Royal Television Academy Craft & Design Awards, often referred to as RTS Craft & Design Awards, are given annually by the Royal Television Society to recognize the "huge variety of skills and processes involved in programme production". The awards were presented for the first time in 1997, with twenty-two categories being awarded.

Unlike the Royal Television Society Programme Awards, which usually take place on March, the craft and design awards are held later on the year on November. The most recent edition of the awards took place on 5 December 2022 at the London Hilton on Park Lane, London, and was hosted by television presenter and journalist Ranvir Singh. The nominations were announced on 14 November 2022.

Categories
As of 2022, 28 competitive categories are presented.

 Casting
 Costume Design - Drama
 Costume Design - Entertainment & Non Drama
 Design - Programme Content Sequences
 Design - Titles
 Director - Comedy Drama/Situation Comedy
 Director - Documentary/Factual & Non Drama
 Director - Drama
 Director - Multicamera
 Editing - Documentary/Factual
 Editing - Drama
 Editing - Entertainment and Comedy
 Editing - Sport
 Effects
 Lighting for Multicamera
 Make Up Design - Drama
 Make Up Design - Entertainment & Non Drama
 Multicamera Work
 Music - Original Score
 Music - Original Title
 Photography - Documentary/Factual & Non Drama
 Photography - Drama & Comedy
 Picture Enhancement
 Production Design - Drama
 Production Design - Entertainment & Non Drama
 Production Management Award
 Sound - Drama
 Sound - Entertainment & Non Drama

 Special awards such as the RTS Special Award and the RTS Outstanding Contribution Award have been given.

Winners and nominees
The winners are listed first and in bold, followed by the nominees if present.

2022
The RTS Craft & Design Awards 2022 were presented on 5 December 2022 at the London Hilton on Park Lane, London. It was hosted by television presenter and journalist Ranvir Singh. The nominations were announced on 14 November 2022.

2021
The RTS Craft & Design Awards 2021 were presented on 22 November 2021 at London Hilton on Park Lane, London. It was hosted by British presenter and journalist Charlene White. The nominees were announced on 11 March 2021.

2020
The RTS Craft & Design Awards 2020 were presented on 23 November 2020 on the RTS website. The nominations were announced on 4 November 2020.

2019
The RTS Craft & Design Awards 2019 were presented on 25 November 2019 at London Hilton on Park Lane, London. It was hosted by British comedian Ahir Shah. The nominations were announced on 7 November 2019.

2018
The RTS Craft & Design Awards 2018 were presented on 26 November 2018 at London Hilton on Park Lane, London. It was hosted by English comedian Tom Allen. The nominations were announced on 9 November 2018.

2017
The RTS Craft & Design Awards 2017 were presented on 27 November 2017 at London Hilton on Park Lane, London. The nominations were announced on 7 November 2017.

2016
The RTS Craft & Design Awards 2016 were presented on 28 November 2016 at London Hilton on Park Lane, London. It was hosted by Danish-British comedian Sandi Toksvig. The nominations were announced on 11 November 2016.

2015
The RTS Craft & Design Awards 2015 were presented on 30 November 2015 at London Hilton on Park Lane, London. It was hosted by Scottish comedian Susan Calman.

2014
The RTS Craft & Design Awards 2014 were presented on 1 December 2014 at London Hilton on Park Lane, London. It was hosted by British comedian Jennifer Saunders.

2013
The RTS Craft & Design Awards 2013 were presented on 18 November 2013 at The Savoy, Strand, London. It was hosted by British comedian Brian Conley.

2012
The RTS Craft & Design Awards 2012 were presented on 26 November 2012 at The Savoy, Strand, London. It was hosted by British presenter Laura Hamilton.

2011
Source:

2010
The RTS Craft & Design Awards 2010 were presented on 24 November 2010 at The Savoy, Strand, London. It was hosted by British presenters Richard McCourt and Dominic Wood.

2009
The RTS Craft & Design Awards 2009 were presented on 23 November 2009 at The Park Lane Hotel, Piccadilly in London. The evening was hosted by presenter and actor Justin Lee Collins.

2008
The RTS Craft & Design Awards 2008 were presented on 24 November 2008.

2007
The RTS Craft and Design Awards 2007 took place on 29 November 2007 at The Savoy in London. It was hosted by Fearne Cotton and Holly Willoughby.

2006
The RTS Craft and Design Awards 2006 took place on 20 November 2006 at The Savoy in London. It was hosted by Fearne Cotton and Holly Willoughby.

2005
The RTS Craft and Design Awards 2005 took place on 22 November 2005 at The Savoy in London. It was hosted by Christopher Eccleston.

2004
The RTS Crafts & Design Awards 2004 were presented on 30 November 2004 at the Savoy Hotel in London.

2003
Source:

2002
The RTS Craft and Design Awards 2002 took place on 18 November 2022 at The Savoy in London. It was hosted by Richard Whiteley.

2001
The RTS Craft and Design Awards 2001 took place on 29 November 2001 at London Hilton on Park Lane  in London. It was hosted by Richard Wilson.

2000
Source:

1999
Source:

1997/1998
Source:

See also
 Royal Television Society Programme Awards
 British Academy Television Craft Awards

References

External links
 Official awards site

Award ceremonies
Television awards
British television awards
Award ceremonies in the United Kingdom